Countess Palatine Irmengard of the Rhine, also known as Irmengard of Baden ( – 24 February 1260) was Margravine of Baden by her marriage to Herman V, Margrave of Baden-Baden. She brought the city of Pforzheim into the marriage.

She was the daughter of Henry V, Count Palatine of the Rhine, who was also duke of Brunswick, and his wife Agnes of Hohenstaufen. Her paternal grandfather was Henry the Lion.

She and her husband are known as patrons of the monasteries in Maulbronn, Tennenbach, Herrenalb, Selz, Salem and Backnang Abbey.  In 1245, Irmengard founded Lichtenthal Abbey in Lichtental (now part of Baden-Baden, where later the Margraves of Baden would be buried.  However, the construction of this abbey exceeded her financial resources and she had to request assistance from her sons.  In March 1245, she was given several manors and rights.

In this case, the brothers gave away more than they owned, because they had earlier enfeoffed Louis of Liebenzell with two parts of the tithes. This led to a lengthy dispute.

Marriage and issue
Around 1217, Irmengard married Herman V, Margrave of Baden-Baden.  They had the following children:
Herman VI (1225 – 4 October 1250), Margrave of Baden
Rudolf I (1230 – 19 November 1288), Margrave of Baden
Mechtild (died 1258) married on April 4, 1251 to Ulrich I, Count of Württemberg ( – 25 February 1265)
Elisabeth, who married firstly Count Eberhard of Eberstein, and secondly Louis II of Lichtenberg

In 1248, Irmengard transferred her husband's body from Backnang Abbey to Lichtenthal Abbey.

External links
Entry at genealogie-mittelalter.de

House of Welf
Margravines of Baden
German countesses
Year of birth unknown
1200s births
1260 deaths
13th-century German nobility
13th-century German women
Daughters of monarchs